

About 
In 1976, Mathematics Teacher Training was first offered at Alzahra University by the department of Mathematics in the Basic Sciences Faculty. After the Islamic Revolution, this area of study was further developed into Pure and Applied Mathematics as B.Sc. degrees. The department further offered MSc and PhD degrees respectively in 2000 and 2002. Ultimately the expansion of the programs offered by the Mathematics Department (e.g. Statistics and Computer Science programs), in 2014 the department of Mathematics separated from the Faculty of Basic Sciences and became a faculty in its own right.

Departments 
 Mathematics
 Statistics
 Computer science

Facilities 
 Classrooms equipped with hi-tech technology
 Computer Lab
 Digital and Physical library
 Study room for postgraduate students

Programs 
Currently, the programs offered by departments 
 in B.Sc. degree are in mathematics and applications, statistics and applications and Computer science,
 in M.Sc. degree are pure mathematics, applied mathematics and statistics mathematics, and,
 in PhD degree is in mathematics.

References 

1976 establishments in Iran
Al-Zahra University